François, Vicomte de Curel (10 June 1854 – 26 April 1928), French dramatist, was born at Metz, Moselle.

Biography
He was educated at the École centrale Paris as a civil engineer, the family wealth being derived from smelting works. He began his literary career with two novels, L'Ete des fruits secs (1885) and Le Sauvetage du grand duc (1889). In 1891 three plays were accepted by the Théâtre Libre.

Bibliography
L'Envers d'une sainte (1892)
Les Fossiles (1892), a picture of the prejudices of the provincial nobility
L'Invitée (1893), the story of a mother who returns to her children after twenty years' separation
L'Amour brode (1893), which was withdrawn by the author from the Théâtre Français after the second representation
La Figurante (1896)
Le Repas du lion (1898), dealing with the relations between capital and labour
La Fille sauvage (1902), the history of the development of the religious idea
La Nouvelle Idole (1899), dealing with the worship of science
Le Coup d'aile (1906)
See also Contemporary Review for August 1903.

References

1854 births
1928 deaths
Writers from Metz
19th-century French dramatists and playwrights
20th-century French dramatists and playwrights
École Centrale Paris alumni
Members of the Académie Française